The maroon-backed accentor (Prunella immaculata) is a species of bird in the family Prunellidae. It is found in Bhutan, China, India, Myanmar, and Nepal.

Its natural habitat is temperate forest.

References

External links
Images at ADW

maroon-backed accentor
Birds of Bhutan
Birds of China
maroon-backed accentor
Taxonomy articles created by Polbot